Peter Gunn Grant (3 June 1879 – 10 December 1937) was a Scottish amateur footballer who played in the Scottish League for Motherwell, Hamilton Academical and Queen's Park as a full back.

Personal life 
In 1917, three years since the outbreak of the First World War, Grant joined the French Army's Special Ambulance Service as a driver/mechanic. He was twice awarded the Croix de Guerre for "outstanding acts of bravery". Grant died in the Castlecary rail accident on 10 December 1937.

Career statistics

References

1879 births
Scottish footballers
Scottish Football League players
Association football fullbacks
Queen's Park F.C. players
Motherwell F.C. players
Hamilton Academical F.C. players
Recipients of the Croix de Guerre 1914–1918 (France)
1937 deaths
Footballers from Glasgow
Glasgow Perthshire F.C. players
Railway accident deaths in Scotland
French military personnel of World War I
French Army soldiers